Hypercompe bari is a moth of the family Erebidae first described by Charles Oberthür in 1881. It is found in French Guiana.

References

bari
Moths described in 1881